is a Japanese professional footballer who plays as a right back for J1 League club Hokkaido Consadole Sapporo.

Club career

Youth period 
He played as a regular member in U-15, U-18 Consadole Sapporo (currently J league Div.1). In U-15 team, he played as forward with Mike Havenaar, and in U-18 team played as offensive- and defensive-midfielder. In 2005, the team participated in the All Japan youth championship and he contributed to the runners-up.

Hokkaido Consadole Sapporo 
In 2006, he started his professional career in Hokkaido Consadole Sapporo with Seiya Fujita, but at the beginning, he had few chances to play in the matches. In 2007, he went to Brasil to join in the training in EC Viroria with Shunsuke Iwanuma. He went there on 30 September and the contract would continue until December, but due to many injured players in Consadole, he was brought back to Sapporo on 24 October. On 27 October, he played in J league match against Ehime FC from in the middle and scored the primary goal as a professional in the additional time, which resulted in the winning of the team. In 2008, he marked 3 goals in total, all of them were scored in the additional time, including the winning goal against Kashiwa Reysol on 30 March. He changed his position from right wing-half to right wing-back in 2009 and participated in 42 matches and scored 7 goals.

Albirex Niigata 
He transferred to Albirex Niigata on loan in 2010. At the beginning, he was a substitute member for midfielder, but afterward played 29 matches regularly as a right-back and marked 1 goal.

Kashima Antlers 
In 2011, he transferred to Kashima Antlers on a permanent deal and changed his position to defender.

In 2004, he took part in the training of CS Maritimo, Portuguese club. His direct volley goal marked on 2 August against Sanfrecce Hiroshima was chosen for the best goal award 2014 of J league.

He was assigned to be a head of players association of the team for 2 years, from 2015 to 2016.

International career

National Team 
On 6 December 2010, he was selected for back-up members of AFC Asian Cup 2011.

In KIRIN Cup against Peru on 1 June 2011, he played for the national team for the first time.

On 1 October 2014, he was elected for the national team by the head coach Javier Aguirre.

On 26 March 2019, Nishi played his first match since 2011 for Japan against Bolivia.

FIFA Club World Cup 2016 
He participated in FIFA Club World Cup 2016. He played the final against Real Madrid C.F. for full-time.

He is the first player in the world who was judged by VAR (Video Assistant Referee) in the semi-final against Atletico Nacional.

Style of play 
He is a leader in team defence, often coordinating the other defenders from the right wing. He is also known as good playmaker as his number of passes are often top in the team, building up games from the right wing. Because of his experience as a midfielder, his technical skills enable him to exchange passes in narrow spaces and provide key passes. By improving defensive skill, accurate crossing ability, physical strength and an ability to concentrate, he is an asset in both attack and defence.

Personal life 
When he was an elementary school student, he appeared on TV program "1×8 Ikoyo" as a kids master of lifting. His sister, Sakurako Nishi belonged to the cheerleading team of Consadole Sapporo.

Club statistics
Updated to 13 December 2020.

1Includes Japanese Super Cup, J. League Championship, Suruga Bank Championship and FIFA Club World Cup.

National team statistics

Honours 
Kashima Antlers
J1 League: 2016
J. League Cup: 2011, 2012, 2015
Emperor's Cup: 2016
Japanese Super Cup: 2017
Suruga Bank Championship: 2012, 2013
AFC Champions League: 2018

Vissel Kobe
Emperor's Cup: 2019

Individual
J.League Best XI: 2017, 2018

References

External links 

 
 Daigo Nishi at the Japan National Football Team

 
 Profile at Consadole Sapporo

1987 births
Living people
Association football people from Hokkaido
Japanese footballers
Japan international footballers
J1 League players
J2 League players
Hokkaido Consadole Sapporo players
Albirex Niigata players
Kashima Antlers players
Vissel Kobe players
Association football defenders
Sportspeople from Sapporo